Tiraque is a location in the Cochabamba Department, Bolivia, and capital of the Tiraque Province. At the time of census 2001 it had a population of 1,906.

References

External links
Map of Tiraque Province

Populated places in Cochabamba Department